The 2019 PEI Tankard, the provincial men's curling championship for Prince Edward Island, was held January 9–13 at the Western Community Curling Club in Alberton, Prince Edward Island. The winning John Likely rink represented Prince Edward Island at the 2019 Tim Hortons Brier, Canada's national men's curling championship. The event was held in conjunction with the 2019 Prince Edward Island Scotties Tournament of Hearts, the provincial women's championship.

Teams Entered

Knockout draw brackets

A Event

B Event

C Event

Playoffs
As the winner of two events, the John Likely rink needed to be beaten twice.  Likely defeated MacKenzie in the first game, so a second game was not necessary.

Playoff #1
Sunday, January 13, 8:00am

References

PEI
2019 in Prince Edward Island
PEI Tankard
Curling competitions in Prince Edward Island
Prince County, Prince Edward Island